Emily Azevedo (born April 28, 1983) is an American bobsledder who has competed since 2002. She won two medals in the mixed bobsleigh-skeleton team event at the FIBT World Championships with a silver in 2007 and a bronze in 2008.

A native of Chico, California, Azevedo graduated from the University of California, Davis. While at UC-Davis, she competed in track and field in the 100 m hurdles. Azevedo decided to compete in bobsleigh after watching the 2006 Winter Olympics in Turin. She is supported by her parents, Dr. Alan and Wendy Azevedo and her sisters Amber, Chelsea and Geneva.

It was announced on 16 January 2010 that Azvedo made the US team for the 2010 Winter Olympics where she finished fifth in the two-woman event.

External links
 
 
 
 
 
 

1983 births
American female bobsledders
American female hurdlers
Bobsledders at the 2010 Winter Olympics
Living people
Olympic bobsledders of the United States
Sportspeople from Chico, California
University of California, Davis alumni
21st-century American women